Pleurosauridae is an extinct family of sphenodontian reptiles, known from the Jurassic of Europe. Members of the family had long-snake like bodies with reduced limbs that were adapted for aquatic life in marine environments. It contains two genera, Palaeopleurosaurus, which is known from the Early Jurassic (Toarcian) Posidonia Shale of Germany, as well as Pleurosaurus from the Late Jurassic of Germany and France. Paleopleurosaurus is more primitive than the later Pleurosaurus, with a skull similar to those of other sphenodontians, while that of Pleurosaurus is highly modified relative to other sphendontians. They likely swam via anguilliform locomotion. Vadasaurus and Derasmosaurus from the Late Jurassic and Early Cretaceous of Europe have been placed as part of this family in some studies, but lack the body elongation that typifies the other two genera.

References

Jurassic lepidosaurs
Sphenodontia
Toarcian first appearances
Late Jurassic extinctions
Prehistoric reptile families
Taxa named by Richard Lydekker